Frank N Mitchell (1911 – date of death unknown), was a South African international lawn bowler.

Bowls career
He won a gold medal in the fours at the 1954 British Empire and Commonwealth Games in Vancouver, with Wilfred Randall, George Wilson and John Anderson.

He won the 1950, 1952 and 1958 rinks at the National Championships, bowling for the Pretoria Bowls Club.

Personal life
He was a civil servant by trade.

References

1911 births
Date of death unknown
Bowls players at the 1954 British Empire and Commonwealth Games
South African male bowls players
Commonwealth Games gold medallists for South Africa
Commonwealth Games medallists in lawn bowls
Medallists at the 1954 British Empire and Commonwealth Games